The Colonial Parkway murders were the slayings of at least eight people apparently by a serial killer along the Colonial Parkway in South-East Virginia between 1986 and 1989. The Colonial Parkway is a 22-mile long thoroughfare that cuts through the Colonial National Historical Park and intersects Jamestown, Williamsburg, and Yorktown. Long stretches of the road are devoid of streetlamps or road lights and are extremely isolated, making it a popular lovers' lane location frequented by many young adults.

The killer responsible for the Colonial Parkway murders targeted vulnerable young couples as they sat in their vehicles, each incident taking two lives at a time. Six individuals are confirmed dead. Another couple remains missing and presumed killed. Several other additional homicides have also been tentatively linked to the four confirmed cases. The causes of death included strangulation, gunshot, and stabbings. There was no evidence of burglary or sexual assault in any of the cases. The killer drove his victims’ vehicles away from the murder sites. The linking of the four crimes is circumstantial, and no suspects have ever been publicly identified.

Victims

Rebecca Dowski and Cathy Thomas
The first two known victims were United States Naval Academy Class of 1981 graduate Cathleen Marian “Cathy” Thomas, 27, and College of William & Mary senior Rebecca Ann “Becky” Dowski, 21, majoring in business management and working as a stockbroker at the time of the murder. On Sunday morning, October 12, 1986, Columbus Day weekend, a pedestrian jogger saw a car down an embankment at the Cheatham Annex Overlook on the Colonial Parkway seven miles east of Williamsburg, Virginia and a mile from the Cheatham Annex Naval Base where it was obscured from the view of the road. The vehicle had veered off the beaten path and into thick, dense shrubbery, only a few feet from a 15-foot drop into the York River. The jogger assumed that a drunk driver might have accidentally swerved there so they alerted a highway patrolman who arrived on scene and discovered Thomas and Dowski's bodies inside Thomas's white 1980 Honda Civic. The lesbian couple had been missing since the evening of October 9 after they had been seen leaving a computer lab at William & Mary College. 

An autopsy found rope burns on their necks and wrists, signs of strangulation, their throats had been slashed so deeply that they were nearly decapitated, and the killer attempted to incinerate the bodies and vehicle with gasoline, but failed to do so. There were 150 partial latent prints found on and in the car, in addition to full prints but they matched to no one in the records, however. Rebecca’s body was found in the backseat of the car, while Cathy’s was found stuffed into the hatchback. It appears that Thomas may have struggled with her attacker as a clump of hair was later found between her fingers. Both women were fully clothed and there was no evidence of sexual assault. Authorities ruled out robbery as a motive, since both women’s purses were located within the vehicle, and no money or jewellery had been taken. At that time the police believed that the murders happened elsewhere, and the bodies had been dumped in the car since there was not much blood in the car itself.

David Knobling and Robin Edwards
On September 23, 1987, Virginia salesman David Lee Knobling, 20, and eighth-grade Huntington Middle School student Robin Margaret Edwards, 14, were found shot to death around 100 feet away after being washed ashore with the tide in the Ragged Island Wildlife Refuge, on the south shore of the James River in Isle of Wight County, near Smithfield, Virginia. The two victims were last seen on September 19, 1987, after the young couple had met at an arcade and Robin had snuck out later that night to meet up with David. Both victims had been shot; Robin in the back of the head execution-style, and David twice, once in the head and once in the shoulder like he had been running from the killer. Both victims were partially clothed. Edwards was found with her jeans unfastened and her bra around her neck, but investigators were unsure if there had been sexual assault since despite Robin being underage and David having a pregnant girlfriend, it was presumed that Robin and David had a sexual relationship. 

Knobling's black Ford Ranger pickup truck was discovered on Monday September 21, 1987, by a patrolling police officer at the refuge parking area next to the James River Bridge with the wipers, engine and radio still running and some articles of clothing inside near the Ragged Island Wildlife Management Area about two miles upriver from where their bodies would eventually be discovered. The officer found the black Ford Ranger with both doors open and the driver’s window partially rolled down which caused police to believe that the perpetrator had possibly been posing as or was some sort of uniformed officer. There were two pairs of underwear, shoes, and Knobling's wallet were found in the car, which ruled robbery out as a probable motive. Three days later, the two bodies were discovered by Knobling's father and a search party along the water's edge of the James River.

Authorities, immediately linked the double-murder of Knobling and Edwards to the murders of Dowski and Thomas eleven months previously because although their deaths did not occur on the Colonial Parkway, police connected the cases due to the fact that both sets of victims were couples who had been killed at or around lovers' lane areas, and the two locations were only about a thirty minute drive apart. In 2010, a note was discovered in a box taken years earlier from Annamaria Phelps's apartment. The note, which was undated and purportedly written by Phelps, indicated that she was to meet someone in a blue van at a rest stop. While the Virginia State Police claim the information in this note was previously examined, one of the state police investigators working during the 1989 Phelps–Lauer murders told a television reporter from WAVY-TV that he was "unaware of the existence of the note".

Cassandra Hailey and Richard Call
On April 10, 1988, Christopher Newport University students Cassandra Lee Hailey, 18, and Richard Keith Call, 20, were reported missing. Hailey left her family's residence in Grafton, Virginia on April 9, 1988, when Call picked her up for their first date and they planned to spend the day together. The couple travelled in Call's red 1982 Toyota Celica. It was their first date together, and Hall's first date since he broke up with his girlfriend of nearly four years. They were last seen attending a party in the University Square area in Newport News, Virginia at 1:30 a.m. on April 10. Neither of them has been seen again.

Call's unoccupied vehicle was discovered abandoned at the York River Overlook on Colonial Parkway in Yorktown, Virginia at 7:00 a.m. on April 10, but it was not reported to authorities until 9:00 a.m. Nothing appeared to have been disturbed: the keys were on the driver's seat, and a watch and eyeglasses were on the dashboard. Nearly all of the clothing Call was wearing, including his underwear, was also found in the back of the car, as were some of Hailey's clothes and her underwear. Police later confirmed that it was the same clothing Richard and Cassandra wore the night they disappeared. Her purse and Call's wallet were missing. The wallet had contained at least $20 in cash. There was no trace of Hailey or Call at the overlook. Their bodies have never been found, but both are presumed dead. Police dogs tracked the two students’ scent to the York River shoreline. Authorities initially believed they had gone swimming and drowned, but an extensive search of the river turned up no sign of them. Foul play is suspected.

Annamaria Phelps and Daniel Lauer
On September 5, 1989, just after Labor Day weekend, Annamaria Phelps, 18, and Daniel Lauer, 21, vanished while en route to Virginia Beach. Phelps had been dating Lauer's brother at the time they went missing. Lauer's car, a gold 1972 Chevrolet Nova, was soon found abandoned at the Interstate 64 New Kent rest stop in New Kent County and it was discovered to have been facing the wrong direction, away from their intended Virginia Beach destination. It is unclear whether Annamaria and David pulled over and were killed at the rest stop or if they were killed elsewhere and the killer moved their car. Both driver and passenger side doors were unlocked with the keys still in the ignition. Police found dirt and grass stains on the vehicle’s underside, suggesting the car recently drove through the woods. Phelps' purse was found inside the car, once more ruling out robbery as a motive.

On October 19, 1989, the skeletonised bodies of Phelps and Lauer were found in a wooded area by hunters along Interstate 64 between Williamsburg and Richmond. The bodies were covered in an electric blanket from Daniel’s car and were badly decomposed, which made it impossible to determine either the cause of death or whether there had been sexual assault. The hunters discovered the bodies on a logging road about a quarter-of-a-mile from Courthouse Road, a location about a mile from the Interstate 64 New Kent rest stop where Lauer's car was found. Even though the cause of death could not be determined, there were what appeared to be stab marks on Annamaria’s bones and to her abdomen, suggesting that she had been stabbed to death. Police assume Daniel died similarly.

Possible additional victims

Mike Margaret and Donna Hall
On August 21, 1984, the bodies of Michael Sturgis “Mike” Margaret, 21,  a graduate of Tucker High School, and Donna Lynn Hall, 18, a graduate of Freeman High School, were found in a wooded area approximately 300 yards southwest of the Kings Crossing Apartment Complex in the 10,000 block of Patterson Avenue near Gaskins Road in Richmond, Virginia. Margaret and Hall had been dating for four years and were engaged to be married. On August 17, 1984, Mike and Donna told their respective families they planned to go on a camping trip together. This was the last time they were seen alive.

Three days later, a retired dentist who was walking his dog in the woods behind King’s Crossing Apartments located behind Castille Court discovered Mike’s Jeep backed into a depression off the trail with the passenger door open, keys in the ignition, and ashtray open. Upon closer inspection, he noticed a red bandana hanging from the rear-view mirror, and another loosely tied around the clutch. The canvas top of the jeep had been rolled up and pinned back even though it had rained over the weekend. Inside the back end there were two suitcases and a paper bag filled with clothes. He then followed a trail of blood which led to the bodies of Hall and Margaret underneath a checkered red and blue blanket about 20 feet away.

Both victims had been stabbed and their throats slit. The state coroner stated that Mike and Donna had likely died 
at 2:00 a.m. on August 18, only hours after they were last seen. Both had Demerol, a narcotic sedative in their systems. Donna, specifically had an “extreme” level of Demerol in her system even though there was no Demerol actually found at the crime scene. Donna’s body was found without shoes, no defensive wounds, and clutching pine needles leading investigators to believe that she and Margaret were actually killed where their bodies were found. Mike also had defensive wounds and a comparatively lower dosage of Demerol in his system. Their murders remain unsolved. Some detectives believe that Hall and Margaret were the first victims of the Colonial Parkway Killer due to similarities in modus operandi. Hall and Margaret were a young couple who were murdered in a remote area and had been stabbed to death.

Brian Pettinger and Laurie Powell
Brian Craig Pettinger, 25, a heavy equipment operator, was last seen at a Hampton, Virginia dance club on December 4, 1987, at 11:30 p.m. Two months later on February 3, 1988, Pettinger’s body was found by fishermen floating in a marshy area of the James River in Suffolk, Virginia near the mouth of the Chuckatuck Creek that flows into the James River. He was floating with his wrists and ankles tied, and a rope around his neck. The lead investigator in the case believed that Pettinger had likely been hog-tied. The autopsy showed that Pettinger had blunt force blows to the back of the head. He had also been thrown in the river alive, and then drowned. Pettinger's murder remains unsolved and occurred during and around the area where the Colonial Parkway murders took place. Pettinger also worked as a security guard and loss prevention officer for the same security services company where Colonial Parkway victim Robin Edwards' mother, Bonnie Edwards, worked as a receptionist at the time of Robin's murder.

Laurie Ann Powell Compton, 18, a Gloucester High School graduate, went missing on Tuesday March 8, 1988, after having an argument with her boyfriend which ended with Laurie getting out of his car. She was last seen by him at 23:30 p.m. walking on the “dark and deserted” Route 614 towards Route 17 in the White Marsh area in Portsmouth, Virginia in Gloucester County. She was wearing a purple pullover, cotton shirt with a white collar, purple and cream coloured pants, and a dungaree jacket. Laurie was not scheduled to be at work on March 9 and her family assumed she was staying with a friend. When she did not turn up for work on March 10 her stepfather reported her missing. On Saturday April 2, 1988, Laurie’s body was spotted floating in the James River off Craney Island near Ragged Island. Her body was found nude, no bindings, and with multiple stab wounds to her back. Her death certificate stated ‘unknown’ for date and place of injury. Compton worked for the same security company where Pettinger and Edwards' mother worked at the time of her murder.

Shenandoah National Park Killings
The bodies of Julianne Marie “Julie” Williams, 24, and Laura Salisbury “Lollie” Winans, 26, were found by Park Rangers at the Shenandoah National Park on June 1, 1996, after Lollie’s golden retriever dog - Taj -  was located wandering near the Whiteoak Canyon Trail and turned over to Rangers. Both were involved in a lesbian relationship and on May 19, 1996, the two young women went on a camping trip in Shenandoah National Park in Virginia. Julianne and Laura were last seen alive on May 24 in the park. 

On May 31, their families reported them missing. On June 1, their bodies were found at a remote campsite in the park about a quarter-mile from Skyline Drive off the Appalachian Trail. Laura was found inside the tent. Julianne was found in her sleeping bag about forty feet away, down an embankment. Their hands were bound, their mouths were gagged, and their throats were slit. Both were partially undressed, but neither was sexually assaulted. Although there are suspects, the murders remain unsolved.

The FBI investigated whether Julianne and Laura's murders were related to the 1986 Columbia Parkway murders of Cathleen Thomas and Rebecca Ann Dowski. In that case, the victims were similarly bound and stabbed. They had also not been sexually molested. Both double murders occurred on National Park property - the historic Colonial Parkway and the Shenandoah - which were connected by Interstate 64. Detective Steve Spingola who was asked to investigate the Colonial Parkway murders as a private investigator believed that the murders of Cathy and Rebecca were not related to the other Colonial Parkway murders at all and were, in fact, connected to the double homicide that occurred in Shenandoah National Park in 1996.

Media coverage
In  1991, the Virginian Pilot ran a three-part series on the Colonial Parkway murders by reporter Greg Schneider, who was permitted special access to FBI lead investigator Robert Meadows. The series was published again by the paper in 2010.

In 1996, the unsolved case of the Colonial Parkway murders was presented on national television on the program Real Stories of the Highway Patrol, a series that aired from 1993–1999. Actor Steve Altes portrayed the killer.

In 2007, the disappearance and presumed murder of Cassandra Hailey and Keith Call was featured in the Investigation Discovery program Sensing Murder, whereby investigators brought in psychics Pam Coronado and Laurie Campbell to gain new insights into the crimes. The show mentioned that this disappearance may be part of the Colonial Parkway murders. Psychic Pam Coronado felt that the killings were all related but that the locations of the cars were not where the actual violence occurred.

In 2008, E! Entertainment Television presented a full-length documentary, THS Investigates Serial Killers on the Loose, which features a segment on the Colonial Parkway murders.

In September 2009, it was discovered by CBS News affiliate WTKR that nearly 80 highly graphic crime scene photographs of Colonial Parkway murders victims were used to instruct a class by a retired and now deceased former FBI photographer. Former WTKR investigative reporter Mike Mather found that much of the evidence, stored for over two decades, had yet to be tested for DNA and other trace evidence.

In January 2010, a team from FBI Norfolk and FBI Headquarters met with the victims' families to update them on the status of the investigation.

In 2010, the Daily Virginian-Pilot ran a photo essay on the case entitled "A Cold Case Heats Up: The Colonial Parkway Murders"

In 2011, author Michelle McNamara, author of I'll Be Gone in the Dark, on the Golden State Killer, later an HBO series, published a two-part exploration of the Colonial Parkway murders in her True Crime Diary.

In 2013, the Colonial Parkway murders were profiled in the Investigation Discovery television series Dark Minds, with host and true crime author M. William Phelps.

In October 2016, there was extensive coverage of the 30th anniversary of the Colonial Parkway murders, including an eight-part multimedia presentation by the Daily Press newspaper.

On October 8, 2016, the Richmond Times Dispatch ran an in-depth article on the 30th anniversary of the Colonial Parkway murders case: After 30 Years, Relatives in Parkway Murders Hope for a Break in Cases

On October 8, 2016, the Virginian-Pilot published in-depth story, "The Killer Could Still be Out There: 30 Years Later, Still No Answers in the Colonial Parkway Murders"

On May 4, 2018, the Colonial Parkway murders were covered in featured panel discussion at the annual "CrimeCon" true crime convention in Nashville. Moderated by former FBI Special Agent Maureen O'Connell, the panel featured family members and advocates Joyce Call and Bill Thomas along with Blaine Pardoe, coauthor of a book on the case, A Special Kind of Evil: The Colonial Parkway Serial Killings.

On June 25, 2018, editors at Listverse released a new article, "Ten Disturbing Facts About the Colonial Parkway Murders."

On July 23, 2018. WTVR News 6 in Richmond reported that there was additional DNA evidence available for testing in the Colonial Parkway murders.

On October 26, 2018, Dateline NBC released "Dateline Crime Capsule: The Colonial Parkway Murders" which offered a look into the history of the case.

On December 22, 2018, veteran reporter Mike Holtzclaw wrote an article for the Daily Press marking Colonial Parkway murders whistleblower Fred Atwell's passing titled: "Former Deputy's Death Leaves Parkway Victim's Families Wondering What He Knew."

On April 25, 2019, The New York Times published a story on the use of DNA in the Golden State Killer case, the Colonial Parkway murders and other unsolved homicides titled Sooner or Later, Your Cousin's DNA is Going to Solve a Murder.

On July 30, 2019, The Washington Post ran a story on the search for answers in the Colonial Parkway murders and other cases titled Victims, Families and America's Thirst for True-Crime Stories 

On September 17, 2020, the publication Forensic Genomics published an article by family member Bill Thomas covering the Colonial Parkway murders entitled "The Family Perspective."

On January 15, 2021, the Oxygen Network announced that a four-part true crime series, Lovers Lane Murders would cover the Colonial Parkway murders. The four episodes were to feature former FBI profiler Jim Clemente, as well as investigators including former FBI Agent Maureen O'Connell and former prosecutor Loni Coombs, together with crime scene reconstruction expert Dr. Laura Pettler. The series made its debut on February 11–12, 2021.

On February 4, 2021, in advance of their Lover's Lane Murders television series, the Oxygen Network released a series of videos including "Why Would Law Enforcement Not Release All Records On a Case Like the Colonial Parkway Murders? and "Was the Colonial Parkway Killer Pretending to be Law Enforcement?"

On February 9, 2021, Access Hollywood presented a television series about the Colonial Parkway murders.

On July 23, 2021, The Daily Beast published an article about the Colonial Parkway murders, primarily focusing on the murder of Cathleen Thomas and Rebecca Dowski, the first known victims of the Colonial Parkway killer.

See also 
List of fugitives from justice who disappeared
List of serial killers in the United States
Murder Accountability Project Tracking America's Unsolved Homicides

References

Further reading

1986 murders in the United States
1987 murders in the United States
1988 murders in the United States
1989 murders in the United States
Crimes in Virginia
Fugitives
Murder in Virginia
Serial murders in the United States
Unidentified serial killers
Unsolved murders in the United States